Kuwait Sports Club Stadium is a multi-purpose stadium in Kuwait City, Kuwait. It is currently used mostly for football matches and hosts the home matches of Al Kuwait Kaifan.  The stadium holds 12,350. This stadium had also hosted Kuwait's national team matches during the 2010 FIFA World Cup qualification, which they failed to reach. The stadium hosted the final matches of the Kuwait Emir Cup and Kuwait Crown Cup for the last 5 seasons. This stadium also hosted matches for the national team during the 3rd Arabian Gulf Cup, where Kuwait won their third title after winning 4–0 against Saudi Arabia.

External links
Stadium information

References

Football venues in Kuwait
Multi-purpose stadiums in Kuwait